Edit Romanos Cristovão Savio (born 26 August 1992), simply known as Edit Savio, is a Timorese professional footballer who plays for Boavista FC Timor Leste and the Timor-Leste national football team.

International career
Savio made his senior international debut on 4 December 2017 in a 3–1 friendly defeat to Chinese Taipei.

References

External links
Profile at ESPN FC

1992 births
Living people
East Timorese footballers
Timor-Leste international footballers
Association football forwards